South Liberty Courthouse Square Historic District is a national historic district located at Liberty, Clay County, Missouri.  It encompasses nine contributing buildings in the central business district of Liberty. The district developed between about 1875 and 1942, and includes representative examples of Classical Revival, Late Victorian, and Modern Movement style architecture.  Notable buildings include the Clay County Courthouse (1935–1936) by Wight and Wight and First National Bank (1923).

It was listed on the National Register of Historic Places in 1992.

References

Historic districts on the National Register of Historic Places in Missouri
Neoclassical architecture in Missouri
Victorian architecture in Missouri
Modernist architecture in Missouri
Buildings and structures in Clay County, Missouri
National Register of Historic Places in Clay County, Missouri
Liberty, Missouri